Isidore-Marie-Victor Douceré (born in 1857 in Evran) was a French clergyman and bishop for the Roman Catholic Diocese of Port-Vila. He was appointed bishop in 1901. He died in 1939.

References 

1857 births
1939 deaths
French Roman Catholic bishops
Roman Catholic bishops of Port-Vila